Pyrrhopteryx is a genus of moths in the subfamily Lymantriinae. The genus was erected by Erich Martin Hering in 1941.

Species
Pyrrhopteryx amabilis Hering, 1941
Pyrrhopteryx lowa Collenette, 1960

References

Lymantriinae